Two Daring-class destroyers were the very first torpedo boat destroyers ("TBDs") to be ordered for the Royal Navy, the order being placed on 27 June 1892.

Background
The invention of the self-propelled torpedo by Robert Whitehead and Austrian Navy Captain Giovanni Luppis in 1866, combined with the introduction of  small fast torpedo boats posed a threat to battleships: large numbers of torpedo boats could overwhelm a battleship's defences and sink it, or distract the battleship and make it vulnerable to opposing capital ships. Torpedo boats proved devastatingly effective in the 1891 Chilean Civil War.

The defence against torpedo boats was clear: small warships accompanying the fleet that could screen and protect it from attack by torpedo boats. Several European navies developed vessels variously known as torpedo boat "catchers", "hunters" and "destroyers", while the Royal Navy itself operated torpedo gunboats.  However, the early designs lacked the range and speed to keep up with the fleet they were supposed to protect. In 1892, the Third Sea Lord, Rear Admiral Jackie Fisher ordered the development of a new type of ships equipped with the then novel water-tube boilers and quick-firing small-calibre guns.

Orders
Six ships to the specifications circulated by the Admiralty were ordered initially, comprising three slightly different designs each produced by a different shipbuilder:

Design
These boats all featured a turtleback (i.e. rounded) forecastle that was characteristic of early British TBDs. All six of them were removed from service and disposed of by the end of 1912, and thus were not affected by the Admiralty decision in 1913 to group all the surviving 27-knot and 30-knot destroyers (which had followed on these six 26-knot vessels) into four heterogeneous classes, labelled "A", "B", "C" and "D" classes.

They were armed with one 12-pounder gun and three 6-pounder guns, with one fixed 18-in torpedo tube in the bow plus two more torpedo tubes on a revolving mount abaft the two funnels. Later the bow torpedo tube was removed and two more 6-pounder guns added instead. They produced  from a pair of Thornycroft water-tube boilers, giving them a top speed of 27 knots. In common with subsequent early Thornycroft boats, they had sloping sterns and double rudders.

References

Bibliography

 

 
Destroyer classes
Ship classes of the Royal Navy